Nuclear transparency is the ratio of cross-sections for exclusive processes from the nuclei to those of the nucleons.

then nuclear transparency can be defined as 

Here, nucleon cross-section can be thought of as a hydrogen cross-section, and nuclei cross-section can be as for other targets.

Nuclear physics